Martelella is a genus of Gram-negative, oxidase- and catalase-positive, strictly aerobic, non-spore-forming bacteria from the family of Rhizobiaceae.

References

Hyphomicrobiales
Bacteria genera